Gina Loudon, known as Dr. Gina, is a conservative media personality. She was a member of the 2020 Donald Trump campaign's media advisory board and the co-chair of Women for Trump 2020. She is a member at Mar-a-Lago and the current face of Citizen Voters Inc.

She has said that scientific evidence shows President Trump to be "the most sound-minded person to ever occupy the White House." In 2018, The Daily Beast reported that Loudon's book falsely described her as having a PhD in psychology; she has a PhD in human and organization systems from Fielding Graduate University, an online school. On October 8, 2019, Loudon filed a libel suit against The Daily Beast in New York County Supreme Court. The suit was dropped on April 8, 2020.

Biography

Book

The Daily Beast reported that Loudon's book falsely claimed that she has a PhD in psychology. Loudon does have a PhD in human and organization systems from Fielding Graduate Institute (now the Fielding Graduate University), an online school. A personal assistant for Loudon responded to the reports, saying that Loudon's PhD was in the field of psychology. The publishing company, Regnery, told the outlet that they were responsible for several misleading statements about Loudon's qualifications, including referring to her as "America's favorite psychological expert".

Radio and TV career 
Loudon hosted a radio talk show on KJSL in St. Louis, Missouri, and WYDE-FM in Alabama. She also hosted a television show called America Trends on the Youtoo America TV Channel that aired on Time Warner Cable and Comcast. On December 1st, 2020 Louden began hosting her own 7pm EST/4pm PST show on Real America's Voice, Dr. Gina Prime Time. The show ended on January 13, 2023.

Appearance on Wife Swap 
Loudon and her husband, former Missouri state senator John William Loudon, appeared on the show Wife Swap when they swapped with a polyamorous and bisexual family. Loudon was the first wife to ever walk off of the set.

Politics 
In her 2018 book Mad Politics: Keeping Your Sanity in a World Gone Crazy, Loudon wrote that she has scientific evidence showing Trump to be "the most sound-minded person to ever occupy the White House." Loudon has neither a psychology degree nor a license to practice clinical psychology. Trump endorsed her book in September 2018, tweeting "Gina is Great!" At the time, the book was ranked No. 436,949 in Amazon's bestsellers rank. Shortly after the tweet, the book ranking jumped to 2,590.

Personal life 
Loudon met her husband while she was attending William Woods University. They married in 1990 at Westminster College in Fulton, Missouri, his alma mater. Loudon and her husband are Presbyterian.  The Loudon family have five children, and currently reside in Palm Beach, Florida.

She gave the commencement address at her alma mater, William Woods University, in 2015.

References

External links 
 

Living people
1968 births
Missouri Republicans
William Woods University alumni
American political writers
Women political writers
21st-century American women writers
21st-century American non-fiction writers
American women non-fiction writers
American radio journalists
21st-century American journalists
Writers from Missouri
Journalists from Missouri
Activists from Missouri
American women radio journalists